Admiral Sir Charles Martin de Bartolomé,  (26 November 1871 – 27 May 1941) was a Royal Navy officer who served as Third Sea Lord and Controller of the Navy from 1918 to 1919.

Naval career
Born the son of a Castilian physician, De Bartolomé joined the Royal Navy in 1885. He was promoted to commander on 31 December 1902. He served in the First World War and was appointed Naval Assistant to the First Sea Lord in 1912 and Naval Secretary in 1914. He became Third Sea Lord and Controller of the Navy in 1918 in which year he also became Aide-de-Camp to the King; he retired in 1919 and then became Director General of Development at the Ministry of Transport.

Family
In 1918 de Bartolomé married Gladys Constance Wilson. Their second son, Stephen Martin de Bartolomé, married Helen Elisabeth Dawn, daughter of Brigadier General Alfred Ernest Irvine, of Under-the-Hill House, Wotton-under-Edge, Gloucestershire.

References

External links
The Dreadnought Project – Charles de Bartolomé

|-

1871 births
1941 deaths
Companions of the Order of the Bath
Knights Commander of the Order of St Michael and St George
Lords of the Admiralty
Royal Navy admirals
Royal Navy officers of World War I